Tomopleura crassispiralis is an extinct species of sea snail, a marine gastropod mollusk in the family Borsoniidae.

Description

Distribution
This extinct marine species from the Upper Cenozoic was found in New Zealand; age range: 28.4 to 23.03 Ma

References

 J. Marwick. 1929. Tertiary molluscan fauna of Chatton, Southland. Transactions and Proceedings of the Royal Society of New Zealand 59:903–937
 J. J. Sepkoski. 2002. A compendium of fossil marine animal genera. Bulletins of American Paleontology 363:1–560
 Maxwell, P.A. (2009). Cenozoic Mollusca. pp. 232–254 in Gordon, D.P. (ed.) New Zealand inventory of biodiversity. Volume one. Kingdom Animalia: Radiata, Lophotrochozoa, Deuterostomia. Canterbury University Press, Christchurch.

crassispiralis
Gastropods of New Zealand
Gastropods described in 1929